The A430 autoroute is a short motorway in France. At just 15 km, the road is a short spur which connects the A43 autoroute to Albertville. The A430 follows the N90 along the Isère river valley until the two merge just outside Albertville whereby the N90 continues as a dual carriageway to Moûtiers.

Characteristics
 Length: 15 km
 Toll road
 2×2 lanes

Junctions

Exchange A43-A430 Junction with the A43 to Geneva and Turin.
 Péage de Ste Hélène-sur-Isère
24 (Ste Hélène sur Isère) Towns served: Ste Hélène sur Isère
 Exchange A430-N90 Autoroute becomes the RN90 to Albertville and the Haute Savoie.

External links

 A430 Motorway in Saratlas

A430